Fred Johnson (born June 5, 1997) is an American football tackle for the Philadelphia Eagles of the National Football League (NFL). He played college football at Florida.

College career
Johnson played college football for the University of Florida.

Professional career

Pittsburgh Steelers
Johnson signed with the Pittsburgh Steelers as an undrafted free agent on May 2, 2019. After making the Steelers initial 53-man roster, he was waived on October 11.

Cincinnati Bengals
On October 14, 2019, Johnson was claimed off waivers by the Cincinnati Bengals.

Johnson was placed on the reserve/COVID-19 list by the team on November 6, 2020, and activated on November 20.

On March 14, 2022, the Bengals placed a restricted free agent tender on Johnson. However, on March 22, after signing the tender, Johnson was released.

Tampa Bay Buccaneers
On April 4, 2022, Johnson signed with the Tampa Bay Buccaneers. He was waived on November 1.

Philadelphia Eagles
On November 8, 2022, Johnson was signed to the Philadelphia Eagles practice squad.

References

External links
Philadelphia Eagles bio
Florida Gators bio

1997 births
Living people
American football offensive linemen
Cincinnati Bengals players
Florida Gators football players
Philadelphia Eagles players
Pittsburgh Steelers players
Players of American football from Florida
Sportspeople from West Palm Beach, Florida
Tampa Bay Buccaneers players